Sir William Selby (died 1638) was an English politician who sat in the House of Commons from 1597 to 1601.

Biography
Selby was the son of Sir John Selby of Twizell. He was educated at Peterhouse, Cambridge in 1573.  In 1597, he was elected Member of Parliament for Northumberland.  He was re-elected MP for Northumberland in 1601. He was knighted in 1603 and was High Sheriff of Northumberland in the same year. He was Sheriff of Northumberland again in 1606. In 1611 he succeeded to Ightham Mote and the estates in Kent of his uncle Sir William Selby. He was gentleman porter of Berwick upon Tweed in succession to his father.
 
Selby married Dorothy Bonham (1572–1641). She was a friend of Lady Anne Clifford. Dame Dorothy and Sir William obtained permission to receive Holy Communion - compulsory at the time - at home, giving rise to suspicion that they favoured Catholicism. 

There is a tradition that Dorothy Selby helped reveal the Gunpowder plot, apparently via the medium of needlework as recorded and depicted on her tomb at Ightham. She is said to have died of blood-poisoning from the prick of a needle while working at embroidery. Selby first heard of the Gunpowder plot on 10 November 1605, while riding from Carlisle to Newcastle.

Selby died on 14 February 1637/8 at Ightham. The couple had no children: his estates in the north of England passed to William Selby, second son of Sir Ralph Selby.

References

External links
 Portrait of Dorothy Bonham Selby, National Trust.
 Monument to Dorothy Bonham Selby at Ightham church.

Year of birth missing
1638 deaths
English MPs 1597–1598
English MPs 1601
Alumni of Peterhouse, Cambridge
High Sheriffs of Northumberland
William
People from Ightham